Pakistanis in Oman are either Pakistani people who live in Oman, Pakistani immigrants to Oman and people born in Oman of Pakistani descent. According to official government statistics published by the Sultanate of Oman, the population of Pakistani expatriates stood at 231,685 in November 2016.

See also
 Al Balushi

References

Oman
 
Ethnic groups in Oman